Windham Region Transit District, or WRTD, is a bus operator for Windham County, with NECTD, SEAT, UConn Transportation Services in neighboring towns. Prior to August 2019, The company operated 4 routes in total, connecting with a small handful of other operators, such as UConn Transportation Services in Mansfield, SEAT in Norwich, and NECTD in Brooklyn, Connecticut. Because of the small collection of routes, they have approximately 10 fixed route buses, with some Paratransit vehicles. Beginning August 14, 2017, WRTD provided connections to CTtransit in Mansfield Storrs with the 913 Express route to Hartford, Connecticut.  WRTD also provides Dial-A-Ride within their nine-town district (Ashford, Chaplin, Columbia, Coventry, Lebanon, Mansfield, Scotland, Willington and Windham.  ADA Paratransit is provided for areas within 3/4 mile of WRTD's Local Routes.

Old routes (Through August 18, 2019)

New routes (Effective August 19, 2019)

To improve usefulness and better suit riders, the existing routes were reconfigured and renumbered. This renumbering is part of a campaign to implement a statewide bus route number system.

Fares

See also
Connecticut Transit Hartford
SEAT
UConn Storrs
Northeastern Connecticut Transit District

References

Notes

External links

Bus transportation in Connecticut
Transportation in Windham County, Connecticut
Transit agencies in Connecticut